

QP53A Ectoparasiticides for topical use, including insecticides

QP53AA Sulfur-containing products
QP53AA01 Mesulfen
QP53AA02 Cymiazol

QP53AB Chlorine-containing products
QP53AB01 Clofenotane
QP53AB02 Lindane
QP53AB03 Bromociclen
QP53AB04 Tosylchloramide
QP53AB51 Clofenotane, combinations
QP53AB52 Lindane, combinations

QP53AC Pyrethrins and pyrethroids
QP53AC01 Pyrethrum
QP53AC02 Bioallethrin
QP53AC03 Phenothrin
QP53AC04 Permethrin
QP53AC05 Flumethrin
QP53AC06 Cyhalothrin
QP53AC07 Flucythrinate
QP53AC08 Cypermethrin
QP53AC10 Fluvalinate
QP53AC11 Deltamethrin
QP53AC12 Cyfluthrin
QP53AC13 Tetramethrin
QP53AC14 Fenvalerate
QP53AC15 Acrinathrin
QP53AC30 Combinations of pyrethrines
QP53AC51 Pyrethrum, combinations
QP53AC54 Permethrin, combinations
QP53AC55 Flumethrin, combinations

QP53AD Amidines
QP53AD01 Amitraz
QP53AD51 Amitraz, combinations

QP53AE Carbamates
QP53AE01 Carbaril
QP53AE02 Propoxur
QP53AE03 Bendiocarb

QP53AF Organophosphorous compounds
QP53AF01 Phoxime
QP53AF02 Metrifonate
QP53AF03 Dimpylate
QP53AF04 Dichlorvos
QP53AF05 Heptenofos
QP53AF06 Phosmet
QP53AF07 Fention
QP53AF08 Coumafos
QP53AF09 Propetamphos
QP53AF10 Cythioate
QP53AF11 Bromophos
QP53AF12 Malathion
QP53AF13 Quintiophos
QP53AF14 Tetrachlorvinphos
QP53AF16 Bromfenvinphos
QP53AF17 Azamethiphos
QP53AF54 Dichlorvos, combinations

QP53AG Organic acids
QP53AG01 Formic acid
QP53AG02 Lactic acid
QP53AG03 Oxalic acid
QP53AG30 Combinations

QP53AX Other ectoparasiticides for topical use
QP53AX02 Fenvalerate
QP53AX03 Quassia
QP53AX04 Crotamiton
QP53AX11 Benzylbenzoate
QP53AX13 Nicotine
QP53AX14 Bromoprofylat
QP53AX15 Fipronil
QP53AX16 Malachite green
QP53AX17 Imidacloprid
QP53AX18 Calcium oxide
QP53AX19 Formaldehyde
QP53AX22 Thymol
QP53AX23 Pyriproxifen
QP53AX24 Dicyclanil
QP53AX25 Metaflumizone
QP53AX26 Pyriprole
QP53AX27 Indoxacarb
QP53AX28 Methoprene
QP53AX29 Hexaflumuron
QP53AX30 Combinations of other ectoparasiticides for topical use
QP53AX31 Spinetoram
QP53AX65 Fipronil, combinations
QP53AX73 Pyriproxifen, combinations
QP53BD51 Methoprene, combinations

QP53B Ectoparasiticides for systemic use

QP53BB Organophosphorous compounds
QP53BB01 Cythioate
QP53BB02 Fenthion
QP53BB03 Phosmet
QP53BB04 Stirofos

QP53BC Chitin synthesisinhibitors
QP53BC01 Lufenuron
QP53BC02 Diflubenzuron
QP53BC03 Teflubenzuron
QP53BC51 Lufenuron, combinations

QP53BE Isoxazolines
QP53BE01 Afoxolaner
QP53BE02 Fluralaner
QP53BE03 Sarolaner
QP53BE04 Lotilaner

QP53BX Other ectoparasiticides for systemic use
QP53BX02 Nitenpyram
QP53BX03 Spinosad
QP53BX55 Selamectin, combinations

QP53G Repellents

QP53GX Various repellents
QP53GX01 Diethyltoluamide
QP53GX02 Dimethylphthalate
QP53GX03 Dibutylsuccinate
QP53GX04 Ethohexadiol

References

P53